Yee Jenn Jong (born 24 March 1965) is a Singaporean politician and a member of the Workers' Party. He is a Non-constituency Member of Parliament (NCMP) of the 12th Parliament of Singapore from 2011 to 2015.

Personal life
Yee is also a self-styled education entrepreneur and consultant, as well as the founder of The Learning Grid and 360 Education. He is also the author of the book, "Journey in Blue - A Peek into the Workers' Party of Singapore", published in 2020 by World Scientific.

Political career
Yee first stepped into politics in 2011 contesting in the Joo Chiat Single Member Constituency against Charles Chong from the People's Action Party (PAP). Although he lost marginally with 48.99% of the votes, he finished as the second best loser in an election was appointed to an NCMP position in the 12th Parliament of Singapore. It was confirmed by Workers' Party on 13 May 2011 that Yee would be taking up the NCMP position.  With Yee taking up the NCMP position together with Gerald Giam, Workers' Party set a new record in the Singapore's post-independence political arena becoming the first non-ruling party to have 8 (6 MP + 2 NCMP) seats in parliament.

Yee contested in a five-member Worker's Party team for Marine Parade Group Representation Constituency in the 2015 general election. The team gained 35.93% of the votes losing to the People's Action Party team.

Yee contested in a five-member Worker's Party team for Marine Parade Group Representation Constituency in the 2020 general election. The team gained 42.26% of the votes losing to the People's Action Party team.

Education
 PSLE, St Stephen's School
 GCE O-Levels, St Patrick's School
 GCE A-Levels, Temasek Junior College
 Bachelor of Science in Computer Science (Hons), National University of Singapore
 Master of Science in Computer Science, National University of Singapore
 Master of Business Administration, Nanyang Technological University

References

External links
The Workers' Party of Singapore - Candidate Yee Jenn Jong

Temasek Junior College alumni
National University of Singapore alumni
Nanyang Technological University alumni
Living people
1965 births
Singaporean people of Cantonese descent
Workers' Party (Singapore) politicians
Singaporean Non-constituency Members of Parliament
Members of the Parliament of Singapore